Hellions of Troy Roller Derby (HoTRD) is a women's flat track roller derby league based in the Capital District in New York State. Founded in 2008, the league is a member of the Women's Flat Track Derby Association (WFTDA).

History and structure

The Hellions was formed in 2008 by skaters who had split from Albany All Stars Roller Derby and spent the winter practicing and bouting at the Fun Spot in Glens Falls. Negotiations for the Hellions 2009 summer season at the Glens Falls Civic Center began in October 2008 and continued through the Hellions' December bout against the Green Mountain Derby Dames and into 2009. In March 2009, the league announced its inaugural six-bout season in Troy. The Hellions currently skate at Rollarama Skating Center in Schenectady, and play under the WFTDA reulset. The league is skater owned and operated, with members running all aspects of league management, including bout production, coaching, public relations, and merchandising.

The Hellions of Troy Roller Derby League consists of both an A team and a B team, the Hellions and the Herculadies respectively. The Herculadies made their debut in the 2012 season.

In October 2011, the Hellions became an apprentice member of the Women's Flat Track Derby Association, and it became a full member in December 2012.

WFTDA rankings

References

External links
Hellions of Troy results on Flat Track Stats
Hellions of Troy Official site
Facebook Facebook

Roller derby leagues in New York (state)
Roller derby leagues established in 2008
Women's Flat Track Derby Association Division 3
Troy, New York
2008 establishments in New York (state)
Sports in Rensselaer County, New York